Diane O'Dell (born 1953) is an American female serial killer who was convicted of murdering three of her 12 children. She was also investigated for the disappearance of another child. O'Dell regularly traveled with the corpses. The bodies of the three dead newborns were found in May 2003 in a storage shed O'Dell rented and abandoned in Safford, Arizona.

By all accounts, she murdered them because they were illegitimate. O'Dell told police the babies died at birth between 1981 and 1984. She kept the three babies in a storage unit for over ten years. When she defaulted on her rent, her landlord cleared out her possessions and discovered the corpses.  The case became known as 'The Babies in Boxes Murder Case'.

Trial

In her 2003 trial, the jury rejected three counts of first degree murder, but unanimously found her guilty of second degree murder.

In 2004, she was sentenced to life in prison. She will be eligible for parole in 2029.

See also 
 List of serial killers in the United States

References 

1953 births
1982 murders in the United States
1983 murders in the United States
1985 murders in the United States
American female serial killers
American murderers of children
American prisoners sentenced to life imprisonment
Criminals from New York (state)
Filicides in New York (state)
Infanticide
Living people
People from Sullivan County, New York
Prisoners sentenced to life imprisonment by New York (state)